Vidzeme (Old Latvian orthography: Widda-semme) is one of the Historical Latvian Lands. The capital of Latvia, Riga, is situated in the southwestern part of the region. Literally meaning "the Middle Land", it is situated in north-central Latvia north of the Daugava River. Sometimes in German, it was also known as Livland, the German form from Latin Livonia, though it comprises only a small part of Medieval Livonia and about half (the Latvian part) of Swedish Livonia. Most of the region's inhabitants are Latvians (85%), thus Vidzeme is the most ethnically Latvian region in the country.

The historic Governorate of Livonia is also larger than Vidzeme, since it corresponds roughly to Swedish Livonia.

History

In ancient times, the territory of Vidzeme was inhabited by Latgalians and Livs (near the coast of the Gulf of Riga and along the lower reaches of the Daugava and Gauja rivers).
Until the German conquest in the 13th century the Daugava, which now forms the south-east border of Vidzeme, was the boundary between the lands of the Livs and Latgalians on the right bank and those of the Semigallians and Selonians on the left bank of the river. The most notable Latgalian region in today's Vidzeme was Tālava.

After the Livonian War, part of the Livonian Confederation on the right bank of the Daugava river and the Patrimony of Riga was ceded to the Polish–Lithuanian Commonwealth, and the Duchy of Livonia (the left bank forming the Duchy of Courland and Semigalia).

After the Polish-Swedish War concluded by the Truce of Altmark in 1629, Sweden acquired the western part of the Duchy of Livonia roughly as far as the Aiviekste River, since then forming Vidzeme's eastern border.

During the course of the Great Northern War, Swedish Livonia was conquered by the Russian Empire and ceded to Russia at the Treaty of Nystad in 1721. In place of Livonia the Russians created the Riga Governorate, but in 1796 the Riga Governorate was renamed the Governorate of Livonia, administered autonomously by the local German Baltic nobility through a feudal . After the end of World War I it was split between the newly independent countries of Latvia and Estonia.

Subregions 

The territory of the region of Vidzeme is defined by Latvian law as follows:
 Ādaži Municipality
 Cēsis Municipality
 Gulbene Municipality
 Limbaži Municipality
 Riga
 Ropaži Municipality
 Salaspils Municipality
 Saulkrasti Municipality
 Sigulda Municipality
 Smiltene Municipality
 Valka Municipality
 Valmiera Municipality
 Part of Aiviekste Parish
 Part of Aizkraukle Parish
 The Part of Aizkraukle on the right bank of the Daugava
 Bebri Parish
 Irši Parish
 Klintaine Parish
 Koknese Parish
 Koknese
 Part of Pļaviņas
 Skrīveri Parish
 Vietalva Parish
 Alsviķi Parish
 Alūksne
 Anna Parish
 Ilzene Parish
 Jaunalūksne Parish
 Jaunanna Parish
 Jaunlaicene Parish
 Kalncempji Parish
 Maliena Parish
 Mālupe Parish
 Mārkalne Parish
 Pededze Parish
 Veclaicene Parish
 Zeltiņi Parish
 Ziemeri Parish
 Part of Baldone Parish
 Baldone
 Baloži
 Part of Ķekava Parish
 Arona Parish
 Part of Barkava Parish
 Bērzaune Parish
 Cesvaine Parish
 Dzelzava Parish
 Ērgļi Parish
 Indrān Parish
 Jumurda Parish
 Kalsnava Parish
 Lazdona Parish
 Liezēre Parish
 Lubāna
 Ļaudona Parish
 Madona
 Mārciena Parish
 Mētriena Parish
 Part of Ošupe Parish
 Prauliena Parish
 Sarkaņi Parish
 Sausnēja Parish
 Vestiena Parish
 Part of Babīte Parish
 Mārupe Parish
 Sala Parish
 Ikšķile
 Jumprava Parish
 Krape Parish
 The part of Ķegums city of the right bank of the Daugava
 Ķeipene Parish
 Laubere Parish
 Lēdmane Parish
 Lielvārde Parish
 Madliena Parish
 Mazozoli Parish
 Meņģele Parish
 Ogre
 Ogresgals Parish
 Rembate Parish
 Suntaži Parish
 Taurupe Parish
 Tīnūži Parish
 Part of Olaine Parish
 Olaine and Lapmežciems Parish.

See also
North Vidzeme Biosphere Reserve
Vidzeme University of Applied Sciences
Vidzeme Upland

References

External links

Vidzeme Tourism Association
Vidzeme University of Applied Sciences

Historical regions in Latvia
Livonia
Subdivisions of Latvia